Elegia similella is a moth of the family Pyralidae. It was described by Johann Leopold Theodor Friedrich Zincken in 1818 and is known from most of Europe. The habitat consists of old, mature woodland and parkland.

The wingspan is 19–22 mm. Adults have dark forewings and a broad white cross line. They are on wing from June to July and are usually found high up in the trees.

The larvae feed on oaks (Quercus species).

References

External links

Phycitini
Moths described in 1818
Moths of Europe
Taxa named by Johann Leopold Theodor Friedrich Zincken